the 2022 CAFA U-18 Women's Championship was the first edition of the CAFA U-18 Women's Championship, the international youth football championship organized by the CAFA for the women's under-18 national teams of Central Asia.Tajikistan hosted the tournament. A total of four teams played in the tournament, with players born on or after 1 January 2004 eligible to participate.

Iran won the title undefeated to become the first CAFA U-18 Women's Championship champion.

Participating nations
A total of 4 (out of 6) CAFA member national teams entered the tournament.

Did not enter

Venues
Matches were held at the Republic Central Stadium.

Match officials
Referees

  Malika Kadirova
  Sahar Bibak
  Munisa Mirzoeva
  Anna Sidorova

Assistant referees

  Keremet Ismailova
  Hadiseh Mahdavi
  Zahra Emdadi
  Zukhal Khuchanazarova
  Intizora Solihova
  Zilola Rahmatova

Squads

Main tournament 
The main tournament schedule was announced on 6 May 2022.

Player awards
The following awards were given at the conclusion of the tournament:

Goalscorers

References

External links

Sport in Dushanbe

2022 CAFA U-18 Women's Championship
2022 in Tajikistani football
2022 in women's association football
2022 in youth association football
Women's football in Tajikistan